During the 2013–14 football season, Sheffield Wednesday Football Club competed in three professional football competitions. Sheffield Wednesday competed in the 2013–14 Football League Championship, 2013–14 FA Cup, and the 2013–14 Football League Cup. It was the Owls' second consecutive season in the Football League Championship having secured promotion from League One in the 2011–12 season and then securing Championship safety on the last day of the 2012–13 season. The Football League season kicked-off at the beginning of August, along with the League Cup in the same month. Meanwhile, with Sheffield Wednesday being within the top two-tiers of the English football league system the club did not enter the FA Cup until the beginning of January 2014 where they entered at Round 3 of the competition.

Review

Pre-season
Following the end of the 2012–13 football league season, Jérémy Hélan, Danny Pugh, Seyi Olofinjana, Leroy Lita and Steve Howard all returned to their parent clubs following their loans at Sheffield Wednesday. Many players were out of contract in the summer of 2013 and therefore many decisions had to be made on players' futures at the club within May and June. The first transfer of the new pre-season was confirmed just a few days after the end of the 2012–13 football season as development squad player Bastien Héry signed for Rochdale. Sheffield Wednesday youth players Ayo Obileye, Emmanuel Dieseruvwe and Johnny Fenwick soon all signed their first professional contracts with the club, all lasting one-year. On 16 May 2013, the club announced their retained list, with Player of the Year Lewis Buxton, Stephen Bywater, Giles Coke, Jermaine Johnson, Miguel Llera and David Prutton being the senior players to re-sign, while Adam Hinchliffe and Hayden White (who was rumoured to be signing for Bolton Wanderers) were offered their first professional contract. Nicky Weaver and Julian Bennett were released along with youth players Matthew Fletcher and Harry Grant. Also, out-of-favour midfielder Nejc Pečnik left by mutual consent. On 19 June 2013, the first transfer in relation to Sheffield Wednesday was revealed, with Chris O'Grady joining Yorkshire rivals Barnsley for an undisclosed fee, rumoured to be around £300,000. The week after the O'Grady departure, two players had decided whether their futures still lay with Sheffield Wednesday. Promising youth player Hayden White rejected an offer to sign with the team and went with Bolton Wanderers. White had been heavily followed the previous season with his impressive performances for the Owls' youth team and was linked with a possible move to Manchester United at one point. Elsewhere, senior player Stephen Bywater had also rejected signing and went with Millwall on a free transfer for a two-year contract. Bywater played a major part in the side's promotion in the 2011–12 season where he was signed permanently in January of that season. A day after these departures it was confirmed that David Prutton had signed to stay for the next season. Prutton is the second senior player to re-sign after Lewis Buxton signed later that month. 24-hours after Prutton's contract confirmation, Sheffield Wednesday's first signing of the season was confirmed. The signing was Jacques Maghoma from Burton Albion. He has signed a two-year contract after scoring 18 goals in League Two last season from the wing. Another player committed his future at Sheffield Wednesday on 27 June when Miguel Llera signed a new one-year contract at the club, having been a key player in defence over the last two-seasons. Another senior player yet to confirm where his future lay was Giles Coke, but he also chose to commit his future to Wednesday by signing a two-year contract at the club a day after Llera had signed his. Into July and nearly a week after Coke signed with the team, Jermaine Johnson was the last remaining senior player to be offered a contract that he signed to stay for the following season. He is one of the longest playing team players having made over 200 appearances having since joined the club in 2007 Later that day, it was confirmed that the club's midfielder Chris Lines had left by mutual consent. Lines was signed in the summer of 2011 and in the 2011–12 season he made the majority of his 53 appearances and scored all of his 4 goals.

Sheffield Wednesday's first pre-season fixtures were announced on 15 May; the club confirmed that the first pre-season game would be away to Scunthorpe United on 13 July and then the side would, like the previous season, play two pre-season fixtures in Portugal, this time against Hull City in the second game in Portugal on 20 July, while the first game in the country was later confirmed to be Sporting Braga on 16 June 2013. A day later Chesterfield were confirmed to be friendly opponents on 27 July at their ground. Scottish giants Rangers was confirmed at the end of May to be the only pre-season friendly that will be at home, with the game due to take place mid-week on 24 July. The Owls played in their first pre-season friendly on 6 July 2013 with a "behind-closed-doors" friendly. The game was hosted at St George's Park National Football Centre, where the team played Romanian first-tier champions Steaua București. It ended in a 1–1 draw with goals either side of the half with Miguel Llera scoring for Wednesday in the second-half. Tuesday, 9 July saw Sheffield Wednesday play in a friendly-testimonial game against Stockport County. The game was a testimonial for Rodger Wylde, whose first club was Sheffield Wednesday and his last Stockport County, between his career spanning 1972–1989. Wednesday took the lead within 43 seconds when Michail Antonio scored for the Owls, Martin Taylor scored after 12-minutes and the game was wrapped up when Chris Maguire scored a penalty at the stroke of half-time. There were no further goals in the game but ex-Wednesday players Chris Waddle and David Hirst made appearances in the last 15 minutes of the game for the Owls. Three days after this game, one of last season's loanees signed on a permanent-basis: Jérémy Hélan signed on a four-year contract, making it the longest current contract at the club. The weekend after Hélan's signing, Sheffield Wednesday faced Scunthorpe United away in a friendly. It was a first-half strike by new signing Hélan that gave the Owls a 1–0 victory in this pre-season friendly. Similarly to last season's pre-season Sheffield Wednesday flew to a training camp in Portugal, where they would play two games in just under a week. The first game was against top Portuguese side Sporting Braga, whom although were trailing by one goal thanks to a Martin Taylor's header after nineteen minutes, scored twice in the last five-minutes of the first half and then also scored in the second to win the game 3–1. Although it was Sheffield Wednesday's first loss of their pre-season it was still seen as a good workout. Wednesday's second and last game in Portugal was against newly promoted Hull City, the game was fairly even and the Owls's best chance fell after great work by Michail Antonio in the middle of the park led to a pass threading through to Jérémy Hélan, who rounded the goalkeeper and had his shot cleared off the line. Meanwhile, Hull's best chance was when they scored, though the goal was disallowed for offside. Another pre-season workout was completed, but this time finished in a goalless draw. Sheffield Wednesday returned from their trip to Portugal in the week commencing 22 July, where they prepared for their final two pre-season friendlies against Rangers and Chesterfield. The Rangers game was the only home friendly of pre-season for the Owls and Rangers brought 6,000 fans to the game, selling out the away stand at Hillsborough Stadium, just for a friendly match. Although the away support was as if the game was a competitive fixture, the match was still played like a friendly. Both sides were fairly evenly matched and when Wednesday got a corner on 12-minutes Michail Antonio's shot bounced off the ground a looped into the goal to give Sheffield Wednesday the lead. And that was the only goal of the game, giving Sheffield Wednesday their third win of pre-season. Under 24-hours after the Rangers game and Sheffield Wednesday signed their third player of the new season, European striker Atdhe Nuhiu. Nuhiu has played in the top-league of Austria for the most of his career and signed on a three-year contract on a free transfer from Rapid Wien. Two-days later and Nuhiu played in Sheffield Wednesday's final pre-season fixture, this being away to Chesterfield. Although the Owls dominated the first half, it was Chesterfield who were leading at half-time thanks to a goal from Hamza Bencherif on 29 minutes. Wednesday deservedly equalised though late in the second-half with just two-minutes of normal time as Chris Maguire scored from 20-yards. Sheffield Wednesday's pre-season was over after seven pre-season friendlies in preparation for the upcoming season, with the first game a week away against Queens Park Rangers.

August
On the day before the first game of the season, Sheffield Wednesday signed central defender Kamil Zayatte on a free transfer on a two-year-long contract. Zayatte had been on trial with the Owls throughout pre-season and impressed enough to earn himself a deal. Later on that same day and Wednesday winger Danny Mayor went out on loan to League Two side Bury for the entire season. On Saturday 3 August, the first day of the season, Sheffield Wednesday couldn't really ask for harder opponents on the first day with Queens Park Rangers being favourites for promotion and having a high quality in-depth squad with most players being used to playing in the Premier League. Manager Dave Jones gave débuts to new signings Kamil Zayatte and Atdhe Nuhiu, who both had just managed to gain international clearance before the game. The game kicked off at Loftus Road in front of a full house and Rangers were soon on the upper hand with Andrew Johnson having an effort from distance just go wide and volley well saved as well. Once the game settled down, Wednesday got their fair share of chances with Atdhe Nuhiu's volley and shot inside the box being saved and going wide respectively. Then on nineteen-minutes Nuhiu wiggled his way out of two defenders' challenges cut inside and hit a shot that sailed into the bottom corner, giving the Owls the lead and a début goal for the 6-foot 6-inch striker Atdhe Nuhiu. Although the game continued to be evenly matched, Rangers were the ones who were creating the chances. Junior Hoilett got his shot over the bar from close range and then Bobby Zamora was denied by a save from Chris Kirkland. Soon after, a long ball by David Prutton over the top sent Michail Antonio through on goal, who was clipped from behind by the opposing defender in the box, but the referee waved away the penalty claims. If a penalty had been given, it would surely have been a red card as well as the opposing defender was the last man. Two minutes later when QPR gained a corner and took it quickly, Sheffield Wednesday were asleep and not aware of the danger, Junior Hoilett cut inside, took a shot that was going wide until the ball was passed into the net by Nedum Onuoha to put the game level. After the goal Queens Park Rangers had the momentum and the Owls were just looking to hang on for five minutes until half-time. However, three minutes later a Joey Barton header was saved by Kirkland and the rebound was volleyed in by Andrew Johnson, and the Owls were behind. Dave Jones was very frustrated at half-time, and in the second half, Hoilett continued to run riot and had another opportunity excellently saved by Chris Kirkland. Soon after, Jermaine Johnson and Michail Antonio found themselves two-on-one when the Owls pounced on the counter-attack, and when the ball was slid to Antonio with the goal gaping at his mercy he hit the ball over the bar. Then substitute Jacques Maghoma (also making his début) was taken down in the box by Joey Barton (who had just been booked), the referee stopped play but only to book Maghoma for diving. Replays revealed that the penalty should have been given with Barton being sent off in a result of this. Then to add to Maghoma and Wednesday's woes, he went on to hit the post. The first game of the season ended in a 2–1 loss against the promotion favourites.

With hours to go before the League Cup, Round 1 fixture against local rivals Rotherham United kicked off and it was confirmed that Portuguese left-back Rafael Floro had signed for the club having spent all pre-season impressing while playing for the Owls. Rafael Floro is yet to play in a professional competitive fixture, although is likely to make an appearance on the day of his signing for the club, with Wednesday currently without any full-backs due to injury. And Floro did make his first career appearance hours later as he was one of three changes for the League Cup clash. The game was delayed by 15 minutes due to crowd congestion, but when the game did kick-off it was all Rotherham United who were taking the game to the Owls. And when a long throw-in was launched into the box, it bounced all the way to the other side of the box where Rotherham midfielder Ben Pringle volleyed into the far top corner of the net. Rotherham United continued to be the better side but soon after when Wednesday got a  free-kick 35 yards out, Rhys McCabe stepped up, and with the help of a small deflection, hit the ball into the far corner of the net to put the game level again. Although the game did even out slightly after this, it was still Rotherham United who played as the better side and when another long thrown-in was cleared just to the outside of the box, it was Lee Frecklington who managed to find some space and strike the ball from distance into the net and Rotherham were in front again. Into the second half and chances were few and far, but the main talking point was when Wednesday substitute Jermaine Johnson lost his cool and head-butted an opposition player in an off-the-ball incident. The officials were aware of this and Jermaine Johnson got a straight red-card, earning himself a three-match suspension on top of the already many injuries to the side. That was the last main piece of action and it was Rotherham United who went through to the next round, while earning themselves 'bragging rights' with Sheffield Wednesday losing and falling at the first hurdle of the competition. The weekend following the League Cup defeat and Sheffield Wednesday faced Burnley in the first home game of the season. Further injuries had hit the squad by the game, stretching the squad to its limit. The first opportunity of the game was when a shot was deflected into a cross and went into Sam Vokes's path, but he was unable to convert due to a good Chris Kirkland save. As Wednesday got into the game it was them who had more of the chances, with Jérémy Hélan's shot from distance just going wide and Jacques Maghoma's accurate free-kick being well-saved by the opposition goalkeeper. Also another chance was when Michail Antonio's cross fell to David Prutton whose shot hit the side netting. Maghoma's clever cross was nearly deflected to an own goal, but when Burnley broke on the Owls, a cross was failed to be closed down by new-boy and youngster Rafael Floro and unfortunately the cross fell to Danny Ings who headed home comfortably to give Burnley the lead. Then just five-minutes later near enough exactly the same thing happened: Floro failed to close down the cross and Sam Vokes headed pass the keeper to put Burnley two in front. Wednesday had been the better side in the first-half but poor defending had led to them being 2–0 down. Sheffield Wednesday came out fighting in the second half and Atdhe Nuhiu's header seemed destined for the far top-corner but span just wide. Nuhiu then had another head well saved and the follow up by Antonio was also blocked. With around 20-minutes to go and the Owls got what they deserved, a goal. Liam Palmer's first time cross met the head of Prutton to pull a goal back for Wednesday. Youngster Caolan Lavery came off the bench for his début for the club, but was unable to help his side equalise and Sheffield Wednesday fell to another frustrating 2–1 loss.

The next game in Wednesday's fixture list was against local rivals Leeds United, just three weeks in to the new season. The game saw comebacks from first-team full-backs Lewis Buxton and Réda Johnson (who eventually came off the bench in the second-half). At 12:15, the game kicked off and it started fairly evenly and the first chance of the game came for Sheffield Wednesday. When a corner was curled into the box Atdhe Nuhiu's header was stopped just on the line by the keeper. However, Leeds almost capitalised when Jérémy Hélan lost the ball just outside his own area, but David Prutton came sliding in to stop a Leeds player from striking the ball in a very good position. With just under ten-minutes to go until half-time and the Owls won another corner, this was whipped in to the far post by Hélan, where Michail Antonio headed the ball across goal to see Kamil Zayatte loop a header into the net, scoring his first goal for the club and giving the Owls the lead. Sheffield Wednesday continued to trouble Leeds from corner's but the home team managed to hang on until half-time. Into the second half and Leeds United came out looking for an equaliser and on the 58th-minute Ross McCormack picked up the ball just passed the half-way line in the Owls' half, ran at the defence, fooled Zayatte as he ran round him with the ball going the other way and slotted the ball past the on-rushing Chris Kirkland. A great goal saw the game level at 1–1 again (similarly to the last two encounters, although Leeds went on to win the last 2–1). The game continued to be a tight and scrappy Yorkshire derby, but Antonio's solo effort and shot nearly gave Wednesday the lead if it wasn't for a good save by the opposition goalkeeper and ex-Sheffield United player Paddy Kenny. Sheffield Wednesday continued to create the better chances though and a long throw-in by Antonio was flicked on by Zayatte where Jacques Maghoma swivelled and took the shot on which was blocked by two Leeds players (one of which blocked partially with an arm but was too close to the ball for a penalty to be given) and bounced in front of goal line where several players launched themselves in to get a foot on the ball, but it was a Leeds United players' foot that got the ball away. That was the last main piece of action of the game and it ended all square at Elland Road, giving Sheffield Wednesday their first point of the season.

A day before Sheffield Wednesday's second home fixture of the season against Millwall, the Owls signed young Swiss striker Andelko Savić from Italian side Sampdoria on a season-long loan. Savić will most likely feature in the team's Development Squad for at least the first half of the season. 24-hours later and the home game against Millwall had just kicked off, with Millwall quite bizarrely having to wear Wednesday's away kit for the first-half having forgotten their own. Millwall without even a point so far this season got off to a great start just five-minutes into the game, soon after Chris Kirkland had already had to make one great stop, he failed to make another as a cross hit Owls' player Kamil Zayatte 2-yards out and bounced into the net, scoring his second goal in two games, however this one was unfortunately in his own net. Their lead didn't last long though, not even 2 minutes as a long ball from a free-kick was sent in by Lewis Buxton and was fumbled by the opposition goalkeeper, then failed to be cleared and Réda Johnson jumped highest to head home and put the scores level again. Then fifteen-minutes later good work by Atdhe Nuhiu saw Jérémy Hélan set himself up for the shot outside the area and coolly finish into the bottom corner, Wednesday were now ahead. Into the second half and Réda Johnson scored again; however it was ruled out for a foul on the opposition goalkeeper. Millwall should have equalised when a cross found the free-head of a Millwall striker whose header went wide of the goal. But with three-minutes to go a corner for Millwall was taken and the ball bounced away from the centre of the area, it was chased down by a Millwall player who went down very easily under a challenge by Hélan and this was quite extraordinarily given as a penalty by the referee. To make things worse Millwall scored the penalty and the game ended all square at 2–2, leaving Wednesday very frustrated.

With the Owls continuing to struggle at the back due to injuries, and Lewis Buxton having been sidelined yet again through injury, West Ham United defender Jordan Spence was signed on a 28-day emergency loan deal and was eligible to play for the game against Middlesbrough that very day. He made his début that very day in a game that started with Middlesbrough dominating the first ten-minutes and as Wednesday gradually got into the game it was they who was creating more chances and with ten-minutes to go until half-time a corner swung in to the box and was headed down in front of goalkeeper by Kamil Zayatte but Michail Antonio managed to swing his boot at the ball sending it into the roof of the net giving the Owls the lead. Chris Kirkland was tested on a few occasions before the break but the score remained the same. Into the second half and Middlesbrough similarly to the first-half started on top and when a Middlesbrough player beat Zayatte to the ball before he could clear it away, it left an open gap for Middlesbrough to cross and Mustapha Carayol to tap in the equaliser. Although the game went on to be relatively even, Middlesbrough nearly doubled their lead when Lukas Jutkiewicz hit the bar with his fierce first-time shot from the edge of the box. The game finished level meaning another draw for Sheffield Wednesday. During the first half of this game, Captain Anthony Gardner had to be stretchered off the pitch, looking to what could be a serious injury, leaving the Owls without another defender and mainly another key player to their team.

September
Transfer deadline day this year fell on Monday 2 September and Sheffield Wednesday were one of the most inactive teams during the day as they were not involved in any transfers what so ever. The weekend before the international break and Wednesday's worst fears of Anthony Gardner were confirmed as it was revealed that he had torn his Achilles tendon, usually meaning a player will be sidelined for around 5-months.

Dave Jones had already revealed that he planned to bring players in and take players out of the club during the emergency loan window which opened a week after the closure of the transfer window. It had already been known that Sheffield Wednesday will have to let players go out before anyone comes in due to the tight wage budget and finances at the club. Martin Taylor was the first player to go out on loan as he joined Brentford for a month. Back at Hillsborough Stadium after the international break and Sheffield Wednesday faced newly promoted Yeovil Town, with the Owls looking to gain their first win of the season. Both teams started fairly evenly and it was Yeovil who had the first key chance when they forced Kamil Zayatte into making a goal line clearance. However, as the Owls continued to push, a long ball over the top, saw the linesman put the offside flag up for Atdhe Nuhiu who seemed to be going for the ball, however the referee didn't blow his whistle as Michail Antonio picked up the ball instead as he was in an on side position, therefore the referee had over-ruled the linesman with the game continuing to go on. Yeovil momentarily paused waiting for the whistle, while Michail Antonio went through on goal and passed the ball square to Atdhe Nuhiu who passed the ball into the net. A controversial goal followed many Yeovil complaints, with the referee discussing the matter with the linesman and eventually decided to give the goal. Replays after the game showed that the referee had made the correct decision. As Yeovil felt hard done by the contest fell into a scrappy, rough affair with strong challenges going in, mainly from the Yeovil Town players. And on 41-minutes, just after Nuhiu had a header just miss the back of the net, Yeovil defender Byron Webster was caught in a rough tangle with Nuhiu which led to both players falling to the ground and Byron Webster seeming to throw a punch at Nuhiu while tussling on the ground. Byron Webster saw a straight red card for the incident and the Owls couldn't have gone in much better at half-time. Into the second half and although it was the Owls in the lead and having the extra man advantage, it was Yeovil who were the better side and somehow pushing for the equaliser. Yeovil Town's Joe Ralls gave his team what they deserved with 25-minutes to go when he took a great first-touch outside the area and finished nicely on the volley into the far corner. After this both sides gave it their all and Sheffield Wednesday now looked the more likely team to score and the fans thought they was about to do just that as a cross found Antonio who volleyed towards the goal where the opposition goalkeeper saved the shot, but also fumbled it, and as the ball rolled and hit the inside of the post, Nuhiu and Réda Johnson raced to tap the ball home but the keeper pounced upon the loose ball just in the time. Sheffield Wednesday were left with another draw, this one though more disappointing than the others due to the position they were in at half-time and arguably should have gone on to win the game.

A day after the Yeovil result and Wednesday signed Roger Johnson on loan from Wolverhampton Wanderers for three-months with the Owls in desperate need of another centre-back. Later on in the week and it was confirmed that ex-Cardiff City midfielder and free-agent Stephen McPhail had signed for the club until mid-January. McPhail went on to start the away game against Birmingham City two-days later. The team and McPhail started the game brightly and although Michail Antonio went close, it was Birmingham's first real attack of the game that led to the first goal. Chris Burke's shot was saved well but the rebound was tapped in by Jesse Lingard, scoring on his début for Birmingham having joined them on loan from Manchester United earlier on in the week. After this goal and Birmingham had the momentum and dominated, and it wasn't long until they doubled their lead. Again it was new loan signing Lingard whom dribbled and dodged in and out of defender's in the box before slotting home his second of the afternoon. And it was only two-minutes later after this goal when it was game over. Jesse Lingard shot from outside the area found the bottom corner to complete his hat-trick. 3–0 at half-time and the main objective really for the Owls was not to concede any more. However, Birmingham continued to create chances after the break and just six-minutes into the second-half Burke and Lingard linked up with each other for Jesse Lingard to score yet another goal. Wednesday did create a few chances before the end of the game, one of which they scored, when a corner was whipped in and headed in for a late consolation goal by Kamil Zayatte. After the goal and Shane Ferguson nearly made it 5 when he went through on goal but Chris Kirkland kept the player at bay.

As the Owls prepared for the derby game against Doncaster Rovers, it was confirmed that Matty Fryatt had joined the team on loan from Hull City for 1-month. Fryatt started the following game at Hillsborough Stadium on the bench. The derby game was a tight and scrappy affair, but it was Sheffield Wednesday whom created the most chances in a very dull first-half. Atdhe Nuhiu's shot went just wide after the mistake from the Doncaster defence. Jérémy Hélan also had a tame effort from distance comfortably saved. That was all to be noted in the first-half, but the second-half continued to be a tight and scrappy affair but more chances were created. Doncaster had one half-chance from a corner, while Nuhiu's header from a cross was just cleared off the line by ex-Owl Rob Jones. Soon after and Miguel Llera also had his header cleared off the line by an excellent save from Doncaster Rovers goalkeeper Ross Turnbull. Doncaster's first main chance of the game came midway through the second half as new loan signing Federico Macheda, another loan signing by an opposing club from Manchester United, managed to take on two defenders before his finished was well-saved by Chris Kirkland at the near post. Doncaster's second main chance though was a cross where Macheda out-jumped Llera and headed the ball on-target...and into the net. Doncaster up to this point had been second-best in the game, but after the goal Wednesday did well to not concede a second. Chris Kirkland was forced into a double save after a free-kick led to two shots by the same player. Boos echoed Hillsborough as the full-time whistle blew, with the Owls still without a win this season.

October
The very first day of October landed on a Tuesday where the Owls faced Brighton & Hove Albion down at the south coast. Brighton had the first major chance of the game as a ball over the Owls' defence saw Ashley Barnes go through on goal, but keeper Kirkland made an excellent save to keep the scores level. Chris Kirkland continued to make some good saves and Brighton nearly had a penalty given as Kazenga LuaLua was brought down in the box by Lewis Buxton. However, the referee waved away the protests in which replays revealed it would have been a fairly 'soft' penalty to give. Although it was Brighton who were creating more chances it was Sheffield Wednesday who took the lead three-minutes before the break. Great work by Jérémy Hélan saw him take on two players before crossing low in the box, where loanee Matty Fryatt touched and swivelled before blasting the ball home into the back of the net. Into the second half and Ashley Barnes was so close to scoring for Brighton again, after his shot from a cross went just wide of the post. Wednesday continued to some how keep Brighton at bay, even when Keith Andrews' volley also went just wide. Into the last-minute with the game ticking down to the Owls' first victory of the season, a cross from Brighton was then headed across goal where Keith Andrews tapped in at the far post. Wednesday had failed to hold on to their first victory of the season with the game finishing level at 1–1. Just before the following weekend started the Owls' club striker Gary Madine verdict of his trial was announced. Gary Madine is to face an 18-month jail sentence after two separate assaults in night clubs. Ipswich Town were the next team that Wednesday faced that following weekend. Sheffield Wednesday went out looking for their first win of the season and nearly took the lead early on when Atdhe Nuhiu's shot was well saved by the opposing goalkeeper. However, twelve-minutes in and a long ball over the top set Ipswich on the counter where a cross found Paul Anderson who comfortably took on the shot and scored. Two-minutes later and a cross by Wednesday this time saw Nuhiu head across goal where Michail Antonio then headed into the back of the net and the scores were all level again. The Owls continued to press for the lead at Hillsborough and Matty Fryatt's clear cut volley was unfortunately straight at the keeper, who palmed the ball over for a corner. Into the second half and Réda Johnson also came close with a header, before Kirkland saved an opposing shot well at the near post. Kirkland then had to make another save, this one excellently, as Paul Anderson nearly doubled his tally for the afternoon as his shot took a slight deflection and seemed to be heading into the near corner before it was palmed out for a corner. And then as the game entered the last quarter of its time Jermaine Johnson dribbled inwards from the left-hand side and had fierce shot from 25-yards out that seemed to be destined for the top corner of the goal, only to be denied by the bar. Another draw and another game without a win came as the full-time whistle blew soon after.

On 15 October 2013, Arsenal's young goalkeeper Emiliano Martínez joined the club on loan to give more competition to Chris Kirkland. Martínez was on the bench for Wednesday's next game against Bolton Wanderers at the Reebok Stadium and it was the Owls whom started the lot brighter, especially when Matty Fryatt came close after great link up play with Giles Coke. Two-minutes after this chance though and good link up play by two of the opposition players saw Jermaine Beckford take on a fantastically sliced shot and score against the run of play with 16-minutes gone on the clock. Just 10-minutes later and Wednesday were deservedly back on level terms as Jérémy Hélan's cross instead found the head Alex Baptiste whose diving header bounced on the ground and went into the net, therefore scoring an own goal. The game was fairly evenly matched up to half-time and the second-half started similarly as the first did with the Owls on top. Jérémy Hélan created the first goal and very nearly scored the second as he took on his man in the box and his shot was well saved by the opposing goalkeeper. Halfway through the second-half with Sheffield Wednesday still on top, they managed to win a free-kick just outside and to the right-hand corner of the box. Stephen McPhail whipped the ball in, which was punched away only to find Kamil Zayatte whose resultant header looped up and into the back of the net giving the Owls the lead. Or that's what they thought until they realised that the assistant referee had her flag up. The goal was given as offside as when Zayatte's looping header was on its way to the back of the net, Réda Johnson went for the ball from being in an offside position, he jumped and attempted to flick on the ball and even though he didn't touch the ball, the officials felt that Réda Johnson was interfering with play when being from an offside position. Into the last five-minutes with Wednesday on the front foot and looking to win the game, José Semedo went in with a strong but fair challenge on an opposing player where he won the ball. However, the referee blew his whistle and without much hesitation showed Semedo a red card. Protests to the referee by the Sheffield Wednesday players were unsuccessful and José Semedo left the field in tears. Down to ten men and the game had spun itself on its head and it was now Bolton who were looking to win the game, even though they had been second best throughout the 90-minutes. Into stoppage-time and a Bolton corner led to a header where Chris Kirkland made an excellent save to keep the scores level. Two more corners in stoppage time later and another header was directed towards goal and Kirkland made an even better save to ensure the Owls didn't leave empty handed as the referee blew his whistle with the scores locked at 1–1.

José Semedo's red card appeal the following week was unsuccessful which meant he missed the next 3 games, including the next one which was the derby day visit to Barnsley. Hours before the game and it was confirmed that free-agent Seyi Olofinjana had joined the club on a short-term contract. The midfielder had joined the club on a short loan spell at the end of last season as well where he helped the team survive from relegation. An early kick-off at Oakwell and both relegation threatened teams started well but it was the Owls' away faithful that had thought they had scored when loanee Roger Johnson's header hit the side netting. Seven-minutes later and Réda Johnson was tackled while in possession of the ball at the back, leading Barnsley to quickly counterattack. Marcus Pedersen decided to quickly shoot from outside the area and his fierce shot hit the post so hard it came back out to around 30-yards from goal where the ball was passed, in the air, straight back to Marcus Pedersen whose touch set him up for a fantastic volley inside the area that riffled into the top of the net giving Chris Kirkland no chance. Jérémy Hélan soon came close to putting the Owls back level though, as he took on a player but his shot was so close to being on target, but instead hit the side netting. Just before the break and Barnsley's Paddy McCourt managed to take on three players while dribbling with the ball from wide on the touchline to inside the box, and his final shot trickled along the front of the goal and out past the far post for a goal kick. Barnsley had been the better side in the first-half, but all changed in the second and it started first when Atdhe Nuhiu's shot was well saved by the opposition keeper. Coming up to the hour mark and the ball was cleared out from a Wednesday corner all the way to the halfway line where Jérémy Hélan touched and volleyed the ball back towards goal and all the players up field, the ball hit and span off Réda Johnson's leg and found Matty Fryatt with acres of space and the keeper on-rushing, but he volleyed home first time sweetly leading to eruption in the away end. After the goal and Sheffield Wednesday were relentless and the opposition goalkeeper somehow kept out Michail Antonio's free open shot from just three yards out. Matty Fryatt's follow-up then went over the bar. Barnsley though looked dangerous on the counter-attack and nearly scored when a cross was whipped in front of goal but the out-stretching leg of a Barnsley attacker couldn't make contact with the ball. Antonio's shot over the bar soon after this was the last piece of action in the game meaning Sheffield Wednesday had still not won all season after 12 games and had drawn all their games in 1–1 November. However, there was good news before the month was up as it was confirmed that Matty Fryatt had extended his deal at the club for a further month.

November
More good news in terms of signings came on the first day of November when a loanee from the end of last season re-joined the club on a youth loan. This was Sunderland striker Connor Wickham. Wickham started alongside Matty Fryatt the following weekend as the Owls faced recently relegated (from the Premier League) Reading at Hillsborough Stadium. Reading were looking for more likely to score in the early exchanges as they had a couple of half chances saved and go wide. But it was on 18-minutes when a fantastic long-ball by Kamil Zayatte found Michail Antonio in the box whom waited on the touchline, pulled back for Matty Fryatt to smash the ball home to give Wednesday the lead. 7-minutes later and Seyi Olofinjana found Antonio just inside Reading's area, Antonio flicked the ball over the opposition defender ran towards the goal and let fly just outside the area and the ball curled into the far corner, giving the Owls a surprise 2–0 lead. However, soon after and Reading were back in the game as a cross found the free head of Pavel Pogrebnyak whose header went in off the post. The first-half seemed full of goals as just six-minutes after Reading's goal back, a mistake at the back by Reading saw Antonio set Connor Wickham free whose shot went straight at the keeper but bounced onto the opposition player chasing Wickham down and rolled into the back of the net for an own goal, Sheffield Wednesday went into the break two goals to the good. Could Sheffield Wednesday finally win their first game of the season? It looked doubtful at the beginning of the second half as Reading started again as the better side as they again went close with two-chances, one from long and one from short distance. However, just before the hour mark Antonio did a volley/cross into the box, just keeping the ball in play in the process, and the ball deflected up to Wickham who chest controlled the ball and volleyed into the top corner of the net. Unbelievably, Wednesday were 4–1 up with half an hour to play. And it just got better five-minutes later as Matty Fryatt was set through on goal and he chipped the ball over the keeper to score his second of the game. Adam Le Fondre score from a penalty that shouldn't have been in stoppage time, but it was only a consolation as the Owls finally got their first win of the season... And it was a big win. Unfortunately, Sheffield Wednesday then went on a three-game losing streak to end November, losing to Derby County, Huddersfield Town and Blackpool. This led to Sheffield Wednesday being six points behind relegation.

Players

First-team squad

Out on loan

Development squad

Academy

International Call-Ups

Squad information

Player Debuts
Players making their first team Sheffield Wednesday début in a fully competitive match.

Début Goals
Players scoring their first goal while playing their first game for Sheffield Wednesday in a competitive fixture.

Transfers

In

Out

Loan in

Loan out

Contracts

Fixtures and Results

Pre-season

Football League Championship

Last updated: 3 May 2014  Source: Note: Championship fixtures not listed due to copyright.

Football League Cup

FA Cup

Squad statistics

Appearances and goals

|-
|colspan="14"|Players for Sheffield Wednesday who are currently out on loan:

|-
|colspan="14"|Sheffield Wednesday players from this season that are no longer at the club:

|}

Top Goal Scorers

Disciplinary record

Competitions

Overall

Championship

Classification

Results summary

Results by round

Awards

PFA Player in the Community Award

Wise Old Owls Award

Sheffield Wednesday Community Champion

Sheffield Wednesday Academy Player of the Year

The IV Northern Programme Club Merit Award

The Football League Family Excellence Award

Student Employer of the Year

LMA Performance of the Week

Sky Bet Football League Team of the Week

The 72 Championship Team of the Week

League Football Education Goal of the Month

References

2013-14
2013–14 Football League Championship by team